Guisclafred (died circa 821) was the Count of Carcassonne from 810. He was the eldest son and successor of Bello of Carcassonne. His brothers were Sunyer I of Ampurias, Sunifred I of Barcelona, and Oliba I of Carcassonne. 

When Bello died, his sons partitioned his domains between them, according to the eldest the chief city of Carcassonne. He was succeeded after a short reign by his brother Oliba.

820s deaths
9th-century Visigothic people
Counts of Carcassonne
Year of birth unknown
Nobility of the Carolingian Empire